Mount Hotaka may refer to:

, a stratovolcano in Gunma Prefecture, Japan
, a mountain in Nagano and Gifu Prefectures, Japan